Robert Crawford  (born 1959) is a Scottish poet, scholar and critic. He is currently Professor of English at the University of St Andrews.

Early life
Robert Crawford was born in Bellshill, Scotland, and grew up in Cambuslang. He was educated at the private Hutchesons' Grammar School and in the same city at Glasgow University, where he received his M.A. degree. He then went to Balliol College, Oxford, where he received his D. Phil.

Family
His paternal grandfather was a Minister in the Church of Scotland and Crawford considers himself a "Christian with a Presbyterian accent, rather than a Protestant", which he feels has rather assertive overtones in the contemporary West of Scotland. He has written on the relationship between science and religion as well as religious poetry.

Themes
His main interest is in Post-Enlightenment Scottish literature, including Robert Burns and Robert Fergusson, but he has a keen interest in contemporary poetry, including Edwin Morgan, Douglas Dunn and Liz Lochhead.

Crawford is a prolific and successful poet and concerns himself with the nature and processes of creative writing. He has a particular interest in the work of T. S. Eliot and other aspects of Modernism.

He is interested in the relationship between literature, particularly poetry, and modern science, including information technology. He says he shares an appreciation of poetry and science as kinds of discovery quickened by observation and imagination. He even goes so far as to claim that it "is part of the poet's delight even duty, to use such [scientific] words and experience in poetry".

The geography and place names of Scotland feature very prominently in his own poems and he takes a lively interest in the developing politics of contemporary Scotland, as well as science, politics, religion, landscape, and environment and spirituality. Many of his poems also deal with gender and sex (particularly married sex).

Language
Crawford writes in a modern English, with a few nods to dialect words, with an occasional made-up word or a word borrowed from technical science. The main forms he uses are short and lyrical. He has translated from the 17th-century Latin of the Aberdeenshire poet Arthur Johnston.

He was a founder of the international magazine Verse in 1984 and worked as poetry editor for the Edinburgh publisher Polygon in the 1990s. With Simon Armitage, he is co-editor of The Penguin Book of Poetry from Britain and Ireland since 1945 (1998) and, with Mick Imlah, he co-edited The New Penguin Book of Scottish Verse (2000). He publishes poetry and occasional works of criticism in the London Review of Books and The Times Literary Supplement.

Awards
He has won several prizes, notably 
1988: Eric Gregory Award
1993: Scottish Arts Council Book Award for Identifying Poets
1999: Scottish Arts Council Book Award for Spirit Machines
2007: Saltire Society's Scottish Research Book of the Year for Scotland's Books; The Penguin History of Scottish Literature,
He is a Fellow of the Royal Society of Edinburgh (FRSE).
In August 2011 he was elected a fellow of the British Academy.

Works
 The Bard: Robert Burns, A Biography. 2021
Young Eliot: A Biography. 2015
 
 
 "Eliot After the Wasteland," 2022

Poetry books
 
 
 
 Spirit Machines (1999)

Co-authored

Edited

Anthologies

References

External links
 "Robert Crawford", Contemporary Writers, British Council
 "Biology by Robert Crawford and a response by biologist Rona Ramsay", The Poetry House, St. Andrew’s University
 "Robert Crawford", Literary Encyclopedia

20th-century Scottish poets
1959 births
20th-century British male writers
21st-century British male writers
21st-century Scottish poets
Academics of the University of St Andrews
Alumni of Balliol College, Oxford
Alumni of the University of Glasgow
Fellows of the British Academy
Fellows of the Royal Society of Edinburgh
Living people
People from Cambuslang
Scottish male poets
Scottish scholars and academics